Big River 118A is an Indian reserve of the Big River First Nation in Saskatchewan.

References

Indian reserves in Saskatchewan
Division No. 16, Saskatchewan